Oleksandriiske (Олександрійське) is an urban-type settlement in Oleksandriia Raion, Ukraine. Originally established in 1947 as a coal miners' settlement, in 1949 it was named as Dymytrove (Ukrainian; Dimitrovo, Russian) after the Bulgarian Communist Georgy Dimitrov. It was renamed to Oleksandriiske in 2016 as part of Decommunization in Ukraine. Oleksandriiske belongs to Oleksandriia settlement hromada, one of the hromadas of Ukraine. Population: 

Until 18 July 2020, Oleksandriiske belonged to Oleksandriia Municipality. The municipality was abolished as an administrative unit in July 2020 as part of the administrative reform of Ukraine, which reduced the number of raions of Kirovohrad Oblast to four. The area of Oleksandriia Municipality was merged into Oleksandriia Raion.

References

Urban-type settlements in Oleksandriia Raion